Eupithecia subrubescens is a moth in the family Geometridae. It is found in India (Himachal Pradesh, Punjab), Pakistan (Kohistan), Jammu & Kashmir and Nepal.

References

Moths described in 1888
subrubescens
Moths of Asia